Xanthophyllum reflexum is a tree in the family Polygalaceae. The specific epithet  is from the Latin meaning "bent backwards", referring to the flower petals.

Description
The smooth bark is whitish brown or greenish yellow. The flowers are yellowish white, drying dark red.

Distribution and habitat
Xanthophyllum reflexum is endemic to Borneo and confined to Sarawak. Its habitat is lowland mixed dipterocarp forest.

References

reflexum
Endemic flora of Borneo
Trees of Borneo
Flora of Sarawak
Plants described in 1982